The 1962 New York state election was held on November 6, 1962, to elect the governor, the lieutenant governor, the state comptroller, the attorney general, a judge of the New York Court of Appeals and a U.S. Senator, as well as all members of the New York State Assembly and the New York State Senate.

Background
Judge Charles W. Froessel would reach the constitutional age limit of 70 years at the end of the year.

Nominations
The Socialist Labor state convention met on April 1, and nominated again the same ticket as in 1958, headed by Eric Hass for Governor

The Democratic state convention met from September 16 to 18 at Syracuse, New York, and nominated U.S. Attorney for the Southern District of New York Robert M. Morgenthau for governor on the second ballot over Frank D. O'Connor, Samuel S. Stratton, Howard J. Samuels, James Farley, and Abraham Beame. They also nominated Mayor of Binghamton John J. Burns for lieutenant governor; Manhattan Borough President Edward R. Dudley for attorney general; James B. Donovan for the U.S. Senate; and re-nominated the incumbent Comptroller Arthur Levitt.

The Republican state convention met on September 19 at Buffalo, New York, and renominated the incumbents Rockefeller, Wilson, Lefkowitz and Javits; and completed the ticket with John P. Lomenzo for Comptroller and New York Supreme Court Justice Marcus G. Christ for the Court of Appeals.

The Liberal Party met on September 19, and endorsed the Democratic ticket.

The Socialist Workers Party nominated a full slate, and filed a petition to nominate candidates.

The Conservative Party selected on July 13 David H. Jaquith to run for governor. They filed a petition to nominate candidates which was challenged by the Republicans. On October 1, the Republican State Chairman L. Judson Morhouse announced that his party dropped the suit, and the ticket went on the ballot.

Result
Four Republicans and two Democrat/Liberals were elected. 

The incumbents Rockefeller, Wilson, Levitt, Lefkowitz and Javits were re-elected.

Note: The vote for governor is used to define ballot access, for automatic access are necessary 50,000 votes.

Notes

Vote totals from New York Red Book 1963

See also
New York gubernatorial elections
New York state elections

1962
 
New York